Serhiy Norenko (Ukrainian: Сергій Норенко) is a Paralympian athlete from Ukraine competing mainly in category T36 sprint events.

Norenko first competed in the Paralympics in 2000 where he competed in the 4 × 400 m as part of the Ukrainian team but it was in the individual events that he won medals, silver in both the 100m and 200m and bronze in the 400m.  In 2004 it proved to be the relay events he would win medals in, both bronzes in the 4 × 100 m and 4 × 400 m, and failing to medal in the 400m or long jump.

References

Paralympic athletes of Ukraine
Athletes (track and field) at the 2000 Summer Paralympics
Athletes (track and field) at the 2004 Summer Paralympics
Paralympic silver medalists for Ukraine
Paralympic bronze medalists for Ukraine
Living people
Medalists at the 2000 Summer Paralympics
Medalists at the 2004 Summer Paralympics
Year of birth missing (living people)
Paralympic medalists in athletics (track and field)
Ukrainian male sprinters
20th-century Ukrainian people
21st-century Ukrainian people